Jamaal Johnson-Webb (born March 6, 1990) is a former American football offensive tackle of the National Football League (NFL) He played college football at Alabama A&M.

Professional career

Arizona Cardinals
On April 27, 2013, he signed with the Arizona Cardinals as an undrafted free agent following the 2013 NFL Draft.

Chicago Bears
On September 2, 2013, he signed with the Chicago Bears practice squad. He was released on September 24.

Minnesota Vikings
On November 13, 2013, he was signed to the practice squad of the Minnesota Vikings.

Buffalo Bills
On December 3, 2013, he was signed to the Buffalo Bills practice squad.

New York Giants
On May 14, 2014, he was claimed off waivers by the New York Giants.

References

External links
Alabama A&M bio
Arizona Cardinals bio

1990 births
Living people
Arizona Cardinals players
Chicago Bears players